John Hunter Blair (4 August 1903 – 31 December 1964) was a British television producer. He was the creator of Blue Peter, and was its producer from 1958 to 1961. Asked by Owen Read, head of BBC children's television, to devise a programme for children who were now too old for Watch with Mother, the programme began on 16 October 1958 and lasted for fifteen minutes.

Illness forced Hunter Blair to leave Blue Peter in 1961.

References 

1903 births
1964 deaths
Alumni of the University of Edinburgh
Alumni of Oriel College, Oxford
BBC television producers
Blue Peter